In Memorium is a demo EP by British doom metal band Cathedral, released in 1990 through Rise Above. It was re-released in 1994 and was later re-released again in 1999 as In Memoriam, with additional live tracks from the 1991 the Netherlands and Belgium tours.

Track listing

Personnel 
 Lee Dorrian – vocals
 Garry Jennings – guitars
 Adam Lehan – guitar
 Mark (Griff) Griffiths – bass
 Ben Mochrie – drums

Reception 

The EP received a score of three out of five from AllMusic, with Alex Henderson finding it to be "not for casual listener". He stated that the EP was "assembled with the diehard fan in mind".

References 

Cathedral (band) EPs
1994 EPs